Borgen is a suburb located in the municipality of Asker, Norway.  Located some 40 kilometres west of Oslo, Borgen has many different styles of residential areas, ranging from the apartment complexes and semi-detached houses in the southern area of Borgen, to the villas of Borgen Skog.

There are two elementary schools, Rønningen Barneskole and Hagaløkka Barneskole, and middle school, Borgen Ungdomsskole.

Mount Vardåsen offers downhill skiing in winter, and during the rest of the year nice terrain for Orienteering.

Villages in Viken (county)
Villages in Akershus
Villages in Asker
Villages in Northern Asker
Asker